In number theory, Chen's theorem states that every sufficiently large even number can be written as the sum of either two primes, or a prime and a semiprime (the product of two primes).

It is a weakened form of Goldbach's conjecture, which states that every even number is the sum of two primes.

History 
The theorem was first stated by Chinese mathematician Chen Jingrun in 1966, with further details of the proof in 1973. His original proof was much simplified by P. M. Ross in 1975. Chen's theorem is a giant step towards the Goldbach's  conjecture, and a remarkable result of the sieve methods.

Chen's theorem represents the strengthening of a previous result due to Alfréd Rényi, who in 1947 had shown there exists a finite K such that any even number can be written as the sum of a prime number and the product of at most K primes.

Variations 
Chen's 1973 paper stated two results with nearly identical proofs. His Theorem I, on the Goldbach conjecture, was stated above. His Theorem II is a result on the twin prime conjecture. It states that if h is a positive even integer, there are infinitely many primes p such that p + h is either prime or the product of two primes.

Ying Chun Cai proved the following in 2002:

Tomohiro Yamada claimed a proof of the following explicit version of Chen's theorem in 2015:
 In 2022, Matteo Bordignon implies there are gaps in Yamada's proof, which Bordignon overcomes in his PhD. thesis.

References

Citations

Books 
  Chapter 10.

External links 
 Jean-Claude Evard, Almost twin primes and Chen's theorem
 

Theorems in analytic number theory
Theorems about prime numbers
Chinese mathematical discoveries